Aubigny-en-Plaine is a commune in the Côte-d'Or department in the Bourgogne-Franche-Comté region of eastern France.

The inhabitants of the commune are known as Albineyais or Albineyaises. from the original name of the commune of Albineyum in the 13th century.

Geography

Aubigny-en-Plaine is located some 27 km south by south-east of Dijon, 30 km north-east of Beaune and 17 km east of Nuits-Saint-Georges. Access to the commune is by the D8 road from Brazey-en-Plaine in the east passing through the village then the width of the commune as it goes west to Saint-Nicolas-lès-Cîteaux. The D 34 road comes from Charrey-sur-Saône in the south-west and passes through the village before continuing north to join the D 968 south of Aiserey. The D 20G goes south-east from the village to Esbarres. The western half of the commune is heavily forested while the eastern half is farmland.

The Vouge river forms the eastern border of the commune as it flows south to join the Saône west of Saint-Jean-de-Losne. The Ruisseau du Bas de Bessey forms the northern border of the commune as it flows east to join the Vouge. An unnamed stream flows through the village to the Vouge.

Neighbouring communes and villages

Administration

List of Successive Mayors

Demography

In 2017 the commune had 507 inhabitants.

Sites and monuments

The Church of Aubigny-en-Plaine has the peculiarity of not having a transept. It has only a Nave. It contains one item that is registered as a historical object:
A Statue: Saint Vincent (17th century)

Interior of the Church

See also
Communes of the Côte-d'Or department

References

External links
Aubigny-en-Plaine on Géoportail, National Geographic Institute (IGN) website 
Aubigny on the 1750 Cassini Map

Communes of Côte-d'Or